James Richard Bennett (born 4 September 1988) is an English former footballer. He played for Hull City, Lincoln City, Darlington, Bridlington Town, North Ferriby United and Scarborough Athletic.

Career
Born in Beverley, East Riding of Yorkshire, Bennett started his career as a trainee with Hull City. In December 2006 he, along with Will Atkinson, Nicky Featherstone and Matty Plummer, penned a two-and-a-half-year professional deal with the club. He failed to break into Phil Brown's senior team and on 26 March 2009 joined League Two club Lincoln City on loan until the end of the 2008–09 season. He failed to make an appearance for the club during his loan spell, being restricted to three unused substitute appearances in the club's final three league games of the season.

Bennett was one of eight players released by Hull in the summer of 2009 and joined League Two side Darlington. He made his debut for Darlington on 29 August 2009 against Cheltenham Town coming on as a substitute. Bennett left Darlington in December 2009, having played seven league games, when manager Steve Staunton released him from his contract along with two other first team players, David Knight and Matty Plummer.

In August 2010 he signed for Bridlington Town debuting in the 2–1 Northern Counties East League win at Brighouse Town on 21 August 2010. In December 2011, he moved to join North Ferriby United. In July 2012 he signed for Scarborough Athletic, in the Northern Counties East League.

Bennett in the summer of 2018 became assistant manager of Barton Town F.C.

References

External links

1988 births
Living people
Sportspeople from Beverley
Footballers from the East Riding of Yorkshire
English footballers
Association football midfielders
Hull City A.F.C. players
Lincoln City F.C. players
Darlington F.C. players
Ossett Town F.C. players
Bridlington Town A.F.C. players
North Ferriby United A.F.C. players
Scarborough Athletic F.C. players
Pickering Town F.C. players
English Football League players